Toronto Civic Railways (TCR) was a streetcar operator created and owned by the City of Toronto, Ontario, Canada, to serve newly annexed areas of the city that the private operator Toronto Railway Company refused to serve. When the Toronto Railway Company's franchise expired in 1921, its services were combined with those of the Toronto Civic Railways, and are now assumed by the new Toronto Transportation Commission (TTC). The first route of the TCR started operation on December 18, 1912.

Overview
When the City of Toronto granted the Toronto Railway Company a franchise in 1891 to operate the streetcar system in Toronto, the City had the right to require the TRC to build new streetcar lines within the city limits. Later, the City annexed several neighbouring districts expanding the city limits, and ordered the TRC to extend streetcar service to them. The TRC refused saying the franchise agreement required the TRC only to provide streetcar service within the city limits as they existed in 1891. The City took the TRC to court which ruled in the TRC's favour. Thus, the City created the Toronto Civic Railways to serve the newly annexed districts. The TCR was not a separate entity or agency but operated under the City's Department of Works, Railway and Bridge Section.

TCR lines had three divisions clustered in each of the west end, east end and mid-town; the three divisions were not interconnected nor did they have any permanent connection to the TRC network. To move streetcars between TCR carhouses, temporary track connections had to be made to a nearby TRC line. Thus, the need to use TRC tracks for movements between TCR carhouses was one reason the City chose Toronto gauge for the TCR. The other reason was that when the TRC franchise ended in 1921, the City wanted to merge the two systems.

Routes
The Toronto Civic Railways had five routes grouped into 3 operating divisions, with each division operating out of its namesake carhouse. The Gerrard route initially operated out of the Gerrard Street Carhouse until the Danforth Carhouse became available.

Gerrard
Opening on December 18, 1912, the Gerrard line was the first TCR line in operation. It was built along Gerrard Street between Greenwood Avenue and Main Street, and was effectively an extension of the TRC's streetcar line running east on Gerrard Street from Parliament Street. The TRC and TCR tracks were not connected and passengers had to change streetcars at Greenwood Avenue and pay another fare. At Main Street, passengers could connect with the Little York branch of Toronto and York Radial Railway's Scarboro division which would take them to Kingston Road. However, many passengers found the new Gerrard line to be more convenient than the Little York branch, and the latter closed in 1913. The Gerrard line had crossovers at the end stops plus another on Coxwell Avenue just south of upper Gerrard street. Gerrard streetcars operated out of the Gerrard Carhouse until the completion of the Danforth Carhouse September 2015. After the TTC took over in 1921, the TRC and TCR tracks were joined at Greenwood Avenue. Today, the TCR Gerrard route is now served by the 506 Carlton streetcar route.

In 1913, the TCR completed a single-track line on Coxwell Avenue between upper Gerrard Street and Danforth Avenue. This gave permanent access to the Hanson Yard (where the TCR received new streetcars by rail) and connected to the new Danforth line and Danforth Carhouse. The TCR did not operate passenger service on the Coxwell line. After the TTC took over the TCR in 1921, it double-tracked the line and extended it south to Queen Street. The TTC's Coxwell streetcar route operated until 1966 when it was replaced by the 22 Coxwell bus.

Danforth
The Danforth line opened on October 30, 1913 after 14 months of construction. It ran along Danforth Avenue to the then-city limits at Luttrell Avenue. Its only connection to another streetcar line was at Broadview Avenue to allow transfers to the TRC's Broadview route. The line had crossovers at each end of the line plus one each at Greenwood Avenue and Coxwell Avenue. Some Danforth streetcars regularly short-turned at Greenwood Avenue returning to Broadview Avenue. Streetcars for the line came into service via Coxwell Avenue from the Hanson Yard and the Gerrard Carhouse until September 2015 when the Danforth Carhouse was completed. On October 2, 1921, the TTC merged the Danforth route  into the Broadview route and placed Peter Witt cars on the route. On July 1, 1923, a new, crosstown Bloor streetcar line serving both Bloor Street and Danforth Avenue was opened. In 1966, the Bloor–Danforth subway opened (today Line 2 Bloor–Danforth) replacing streetcar service on the Danforth except for the portion between Woodbine station and the Luttrell Loop which was replaced by a subway extension on May 10, 1968.

St. Clair
Construction of the St. Clair line began in 1911, and had a few challenges. St. Clair Avenue was a rough, undulating road requiring much cut and fill, and the Nordheimer Ravine had to be bridged. After completion of a temporary bridge carrying a gauntlet track over the ravine, service began on August 25, 1913 between Yonge Street and Station Street (at today's Caledonia Road). The permanent bridge was completed on June 20, 1914. The TCR had a temporary streetcar storage yard at Station Street which it used until December 31, 1913, when the St. Clair Carhouse at Beacondale Avenue (today Wychwood Avenue) became available. Tracks were located in a centre reservation free of road traffic. There were crossovers at each end of the line plus another at Beacondale Avenue. At Yonge Street, passengers could connect with the Metropolitan line of the Toronto and York Radial Railway which ran from the Canadian Pacific Railway's midtown line to Sutton near Lake Simcoe. At Avenue Road, passengers could transfer to the TRC's Avenue Road route. In 1917, passengers could also transfer to the TCR's new Lansdowne route at Lansdowne Avenue; this was a free transfer for passengers to and from the St. Clair line. After its creation in 1921, the TTC connected the TCR and TRC lines at Avenue Road, expanded the St. Clair route both east and west, and added more streetcar routes to connect with the St. Clair line. By the 1930s, the centre reservation was removed putting streetcars in mixed traffic. The TCR St. Clair route is now served by today's 512 St. Clair streetcar route, and the centre reservation was restored along the entire route in 2010.

Lansdowne
The Lansdowne route ran on Lansdowne Avenue between St. Clair Street West and the Canadian Pacific Railway midtown line north of Royce Avenue (today Dupont Street). The double-track line connected with St. Clair streetcars at the north end, the Davenport line of the Toronto Suburban Railway at Davenport Road and with the TRC's Lansdowne route if passengers walked across the CPR tracks. Service began on January 16, 1917. The TCR line was on an 8% grade just north of its crossing with the Davenport line, a single-track, standard-gauge radial line. As a safety precaution, the crossing was protected by semaphore signals and derails on the southbound TCR track as well as along the TSR line on both sides of the crossing. The procedure required the conductor to set the signals and derails every time a TCR streetcar passed through the crossing. Thus, two-man crews were required on this route until 1933 by which time the southbound derail had been removed. On May 29, 1931, the Lansdowne Loop was opened at St. Clair Avenue so that Lansdowne streetcars could reverse off-street. On July 5, 1931, the route (now called Lansdowne North) was extended via a new underpass under the CPR tracks to Royce Avenue (today Dupont Street). On April 3, 1933, the Lansdowne North and Lansdowne South routes were combined and terminated at College Street at the south end. On June 19, 1947, the Lansdowne streetcar line was replaced by a trolleybus route.

Bloor West
The Bloor West line was completed in two stages along Bloor Street west of Dundas Street.  Its construction started in 1914, and the first stage required filling in a ravine at Keele Street. On February 23, 1915, a temporary single-track line was opened to Quebec Avenue. The line was laid on the north side of the road with a passing siding east of Keele Street. By December 2015, a permanent double-track line was completed in the middle of Bloor Street. Construction west of Quebec Avenue began in 1915 to fill a large ravine west of Quebec Avenue by dumping earth from a long wooden trestle. Service from Quebec Avenue to the western terminal at Runnymede Road started on November 12, 1917 again using a temporary single-track line. The western section of the line was double-tracked for service on October 20, 1920. The finished line had a cross-over at Quebec Avenue as well as at each endpoint of the line. The Bloor West Carhouse was located near Indian Road on the north side of Bloor Street. In 1921, the TTC extended the line west to Jane Street opening on October 9, 1921. In 1923, the isolated Bloor West line was attached to the rest of the streetcar system. Bloor West would be served by the Bloor streetcar line until 1966 when it was replaced by the Bloor–Danforth subway. A remnant of the Bloor West line remained operating west from Keele station to Jane Street until May 10, 1968 when it was replaced by a subway extension.

Facilities

The TTC inherited all TCR facilities except the Station Street Yard. Only two carhouses survive today and have been repurposed for other uses.

Fleet
All TCR streetcars were closed double-ended electric vehicles. When the TTC took over the TCR, it renamed the TCR class designations, and renumbered the streetcars with even numbered only. Note that TCR class F is not the same as TTC class F in the following table, but class G is the same for both the TCR and TTC. The year retired column refers to retirement from TTC passenger service in Toronto; it excludes the retirement of cars converted for work service (snow scrapers, rail grinders) or sold to other operators. For more information on the TCR streetcars after the TTC acquired them, see: .

See also

 Toronto Transit Commission
 List of Ontario railways

Notes

References

Toronto Transit Commission
Defunct intermodal transport authorities
4 ft 10⅞ in gauge railways
1912 establishments in Ontario
1921 disestablishments in Ontario
Electric railways in Canada
Street railways in Ontario